Events in the year 1931 in Spain.

Incumbents
Monarch: Alfonso XIII until 14 April
President of the Council of Ministers of Spain (President): Niceto Alcalá-Zamora (starting 14 April)
President of the Council of Ministers of Spain (Prime Minister): 
 until 18 February: Dámaso Berenguer 
 18 February-14 April: Juan Bautista Aznar-Cabañas
 14 April-14 October: Niceto Alcalá-Zamora 
 starting 14 October: Manuel Azaña

Events

Full date unknown
Acción obrera newspaper from Ceuta is launched.

Births
March 18 - Canito (d. 1998)
March 23 - Gloria Begué Cantón, professor, jurist, senator and magistrate (d. 2016)
September 7 – Josep Lluís Núñez, businessman and football club president (d. 2018)

Deaths
October 9 - Santiago Artigas, Spanish actor (b. 1881)

See also
List of Spanish films of the 1930s

References

 
Years of the 20th century in Spain
1930s in Spain
Spain
Spain